Keith Slater (birth unknown) is a former rugby union and professional rugby league footballer who played in the 1960s and 1970s.

Playing career
Keith Slater played rugby union for English Schoolboys in 1963 and was awarded a Cambridge University rugby blue in 1964. He made his début for Wakefield Trinity during October 1968, and he played his last match for Wakefield Trinity during the 1971–72 season, he appears to have scored no drop-goals (or field-goals as they are currently known in Australasia), but prior to the 1974–75 season all goals, whether; conversions, penalties, or drop-goals, scored 2-points, consequently prior to this date drop-goals were often not explicitly documented, therefore '0' drop-goals may indicate drop-goals not recorded, rather than no drop-goals scored.

County honours
Keith Slater won 3 caps for Yorkshire (RL) while at Wakefield Trinity.

Career records
In 1971, Keith Slater equaled Wakefield Trinity's "most tries in a match" record, with 7-tries held by Fred Smith, this is still Wakefield Trinity's joint-record.

References

External links
Search "Slater" at rugbyleagueproject.org

Living people
Cambridge University R.U.F.C. players
English rugby league players
Place of birth missing (living people)
Rugby league wingers
Wakefield Trinity players
Year of birth missing (living people)
Yorkshire rugby league team players